Sharon Kay Burley Sullivan (born 8 May 1956 in Tripoli, Libya) is an Australian figure skater who competed in ladies singles.  She finished first at the Australian Figure Skating Championships four times and competed at the 1976 Winter Olympic Games, coming in twentieth.

She now coaches at the Gold Coast ice rink: Iceland, Bundall as the only figure skating Olympian from Queensland.

Burley is the daughter of Olympic figure skater Nancy Burley and the sister of Australian champion Robyn Burley.

Results

References 

 Sports-reference.com

Australian female single skaters
Olympic figure skaters of Australia
Figure skaters at the 1976 Winter Olympics
1956 births
Living people